The Eel is an alias used by two fictional characters appearing in American comic books published by Marvel Comics. The first character to take up the identity was Leopold Stryke who first appeared in Strange Tales #112 (October 1963) created by Stan Lee and Dick Ayers, while his successor, Edward Lavell, first appeared in Power Man and Iron Fist #92 (April 1983). Both Eels were at one point members of the Serpent Squad even though the character they portray was not actually based on a snake, but on a fish that resembled a snake. Neither Eel has ever been featured as a regular character in any of Marvel's ongoing or limited series.

The original Eel, Leopold Stryke, wore a suit that could generate an electrical charge like an electric eel and was coated with a slippery substance. He was often depicted as a henchman, normally teaming up with other criminals such as  Plantman, Porcupine, Scarecrow and Unicorn. He later became a founding member of the Serpent Squad along with his brother Jordan, the original Viper. He even worked for Madame Hydra, unaware that she had killed his brother. Stryke was killed by the Gladiator during a heist.

The second Eel, Edward Lavell, started out as a foe of Power Man and Iron Fist, but later became a general henchman like the original Eel working for Justine Hammer's Masters of Evil and the Maggia. At one point Lavall appeared to have been killed, but later appeared as part of the latest incarnation of the Serpent Squad led by Sin, the daughter of the Red Skull. Subsequently, the Eel became part of "Serpent Solutions", the next incarnation of the Serpent Society.

Publication history
The original Eel first appeared in Strange Tales #112 (September 1963), and was created by Stan Lee and Steve Ditko. The character subsequently appears in Strange Tales #117 (February 1964), Daredevil #6 (February 1965), Fantastic Four Annual #3 (1965), X-Men #22-23 (July–August 1966), Captain America #158-159 (February–March 1973), #163 (July 1973), #180-181 (December 1974-January 1975), Defenders #36-38 (June–August 1976), and Ghost Rider #21-22 (December 1976-January 1977), in which he died. The character appeared posthumously in Alpha Flight Special Edition #1 (June 1992), Untold Tales of Spider-Man #11 (July 1996), and Marvel: Heroes and Legends #1 (October 1996). The original Eel received an entry in the Official Handbook of the Marvel Universe Deluxe Edition #17, and in the Official Handbook of the Marvel Universe Master Edition #2.

The second Eel first appeared in Power Man and Iron Fist #92 (April 1983) and was created by Kurt Busiek and Denys Cowan.

Fictional character biography

Leopold Stryke

Leopold Stryke was the first criminal known as the Eel. In Stryke's first appearances, he battled the Human Torch when he stole a nuclear device. Stryke was also a teammate of Plantman, the original Porcupine, the Scarecrow and the original Unicorn when they worked as henchmen for Count Nefaria. He was dispatched to battle the original team of X-Men. He then served as a henchman of the original Mister Fear, along with the Ox, as part of the Fellowship of Fear.

Leopold and his brother Jordan, who was the original Viper, were later members of the original Serpent Squad. This first lineup battled Captain America. Leopold also aided the Serpent Squad in a plot to raise the continent of Lemuria. They battled the original Nomad and Namor the Sub-Mariner. When Madame Hydra reorganized the second Serpent Squad, Leopold remained unaware that she had murdered his brother and taken his alias.

Leopold Stryke is fatally mutilated in Las Vegas by the Gladiator, who was sent to acquire a disintegrator ray that the Eel had in his possession.

Edward Lavell

Edward Lavell is first seen attempting to break Hammerhead out of prison. He battles Power Man and Iron Fist. Later working with Nightshade, the Eel is defeated again by Iron Fist and reformed criminals Discus and Stiletto.

The Eel is seen working with the criminals Blitz and the Vanisher. The trio is defeated by Spider-Man. Lavell also aids a group of villains attacking the Fantastic Four.

In hopes of gaining revenge against the criminal Mister Hyde, the Eel arranged a murder of a woman he had befriended, framing Hyde. Lavell also secretly impersonated "Snake" Marston, joining his team, the Enforcers, and led them in throwing off Daredevil’s attempts to find the true killer. Ultimately, the Eel sucker-punched Daredevil and gloated of his plans, but the Enforcers overheard and turned on him. The Eel was taken into court to clear Hyde’s name and was remanded to custody.

Lavell was a member of Justine Hammer's Masters of Evil, and is defeated by the Thunderbolts. After the Masters of Evil are apprehended, he was seen among the Maggia leaders assembled by the Grim Reaper who tried to claim leadership of the scattered, fractious families on behalf of Count Nefaria. He was captured when the Avengers invaded the meeting place. The Eel once worked against Hammerhead, transporting the Lifeline Tablet on behalf of Caesar Cicero, although Hammerhead soon recovered the Tablet for his own purposes.

Lavell was next seen participating in the Bloodsport tournament at Madripoor. There, he put on a poor showing. He is defeated by the Toad, who seemingly crushes Lavell using his extremely long and powerful tongue.

Lavell apparently survives the fight and is briefly seen as a client for the law firm Goodman, Lieber, Kurtzberg & Holliway. He is discussing action to be taken against Power Man and refers to an 'Eel-Mobile'.

Lavell plays a small role in the "Secret War" crossover event.

During the Civil War storyline, the Eel is apprehended by the Thunderbolts to serve in the so-called Thunderbolt Army.

Following the disbanding of the Thunderbolt Army, the Eel was among the villains at Stilt-Man's funeral at the Bar with No Name at which Punisher poisoned the drinks and then blew up the bar.

Lavell turned up as a member of a new Serpent Squad led by Sin, the daughter of the Red Skull. He participates in several murderous missions, including one intended to damage the Asian stock markets. He breaks Crossbones out of jail and later attacked the White House, but he was stopped by the new Captain America.

During the Original Sin storyline, the Eel is relaxing in his lounge alongside his goons when he receives an unexpected visit from the Black Cat. The Eel taunts her with the fallout from her capture by the Superior Spider-Man (Doctor Octopus' mind in Spider-Man's body) and then attacks her. The Black Cat retaliates revealing her companion, Electro, who attacks the Eel's goons while the Black Cat taunts the Eel saying that she will take everything from him. Mister Negative and Phil Urich (who is now leading the remnants of the Goblin Underground as the self-proclaimed Goblin King) are waiting for the Eel in order to divide the criminal underground after Norman Osborn's downfall, but they are stunned by seeing the Eel crashing into the place when the Black Cat comes into view.

As part of the All-New, All-Different Marvel event, the Eel appears as a member of the Viper's Serpent Society under its new name of Serpent Solutions.

Powers and abilities
Leopold Stryke designed the original Eel costume, which consisted of electrically superconducting fabric sandwiched in between body insulation and a layer of near-frictionless synthetic fabric. The Eel costume featured small devices capable of generating large and small bursts of electricity. It could fire electrical bolts (initially only through his suit's chest protector) and give off bright glows, as well as set up an electric current in the costume that would shock anyone touching it. The costume was coated with a greasy silicon substance (which was sometimes asbestos grease) that made it slippery. The costume could operate underwater. The battle suit also projects an electrical field which allows him to sense his surroundings, even in total darkness. The Eel used various weapons, including a specially designed helicopter, an Aqua-Attractor gun, and an Eel-Cannon.

References

External links
 Eel (Leopold Stryke) at Marvel.com
 Eel (Edward Lavell)
 Eel (Leopold Styke) at MarvelDirectory.com
 
 
 Eel (Leopold Stryke) at Marvel Wiki
 Eel (Edward Lavell) at Marvel.com

Characters created by Kurt Busiek
Characters created by Stan Lee
Characters created by Steve Ditko
Comics characters introduced in 1963
Comics characters introduced in 1983